Creative may refer to:
Creativity, phenomenon whereby something new and valuable is created

 "Creative" (song), a 2008 song by Leon Jackson
 Creative class, a proposed socioeconomic class
 Creative destruction, an economic term
 Creative director, an occupation
 Creative industries, exchange of finance for rights in intellectual properties
 Creative nonfiction, a literary genre
 Creative writing, an original, non-technical writing or composition
 Creative Commons, an organization that deals with public copyright issues
 Creative Labs, a brand owned by Creative Technology
 Creative Technology, Singapore-based manufacturer of computer products

See also
Creativity (disambiguation)